Allan Borman Heath (1 January 1865 – 21 June 1913) was an English first-class cricketer. A right-handed batsman who bowled right-arm fast-medium he made his first-class debut for Hampshire against Somerset in the 1883. Heath represented the county in a single match in the 1884 season, once against Somerset. During this match Heath scored his highest first-class score of 42.

In 1885, which was Hampshires final season with first-class status until the 1895 County Championship, Heath played five first-class matches for Hampshire. Heath took his only two first-class wickets against Surrey. Heath's final first-class appearance came against Kent.

Heath continued to represent Hampshire in a non first-class capacity, returning in 1892 to play six matches for the club, with his last competitive appearance coming against Oxfordshire.

Heath died at Cullompton, Devon on 21 June 1913.

External links
Allan Heath at Cricinfo
Allan Heath at CricketArchive

1865 births
1913 deaths
People from East Woodhay
English cricketers
Hampshire cricketers
People from Cullompton